Located in the heart of Charlotte, North Carolina Wing Haven provides a natural oasis for reflection and study of its three public gardens. Wing Haven Garden & Bird Sanctuary is rich in Southern horticulture and a habitat for birds and wildlife. The Elizabeth Lawrence House & Garden is the site of a world-renowned garden writer’s living laboratory. The new SEED Wildlife & Children’s Gardens provide hands-on exploratory learning and a natural habitat for local wildlife. Together, these gardens welcome visitors of all ages to discover and learn. Wing Haven also offers more than 40 programs and special events each year. 
Operated by the 501(C)(3) Wing Haven Foundation of Charlotte, NC.

History 
Wing Haven Garden & Bird Sanctuary was begun in 1927 by Elizabeth and Edwin Clarkson. In 1971, they donated the garden and house to the Wing Haven Foundation. The Clarksons remained in the home until 1988. Wing Haven's original Clarkson Garden is the Charlotte area's only designated garden and bird sanctuary listed as a local historic landmark by the Charlotte-Mecklenburg Historic Landmark Commission, certified as Wildlife Habitat by the National Wildlife Federation and named an eBird hotspot by the Cornell Lab of Ornithology and the National Audubon Society. There have been over 150 species of birds sighted at the property over the years. Elizabeth Clarkson helped establish the Mecklenburg County Audubon Society.

In 2008, Wing Haven purchased the Elizabeth Lawrence House & Garden at 348 Ridgewood Avenue. Noted author and landscape architect Elizabeth Lawrence lived in the home when she moved to Charlotte. The house and garden is listed on the National Register of Historic Places, in the Smithsonian Institution's Archives of American Gardens, as 1 of only 15 Preservation Partner Gardens of the Garden Conservancy, and is also designated as a historic site by the Charlotte-Mecklenburg Landmarks Commission. Today, with the long-ago loss of Elizabeth Lawrence's Raleigh garden and the demolition in 2004 of the house in North Carolina's capital which was her home from 1916 to 1948, her house and garden at 348 Ridgewood Avenue is the single property associated with her long and important career as a plantswoman and writer. Her home and garden from 1949 to 1984 holds significance in the history of Charlotte, the state, and the nation. (Davyd Foard Hood, Charlotte Mecklenburg Historic Preservation Report 30 June 2005)

In 2018, Wing Haven added the Student Environmental Education and Discovery (SEED) Wildlife Garden, designed to keep the dedicated vision of our garden creators alive by providing an additional place for visitor learning and enjoyment. The central focus is birdlife, seen as a marker of a healthy, diverse ecosystem of native plants and animals — especially small critters attractive to children. The redesigned Children’s Garden at Wing Haven provides a space for intensive production in raised beds. In-ground beds throughout the space include permanent edibles, including fruiting shrubs and trees.

The Grounds 
The garden plan for Wing Haven Garden & Bird Sanctuary resembles a Cross of Lorraine with its long path crossed by two shorter, perpendicular paths, and the house sited between the shorter paths. It contains a number of pools and fountains and is well-planted with a wide variety of native and ornamental trees, shrubs, and flowers. The garden also contains an English sundial from 1705, various terra cotta pieces, dozens of plaques including one with a poem by Japanese pacifist and reformer Toyohiko Kagawa, statuary including one of Saint Fiacre, patron saint of gardeners.

Trees 
Wing Haven harbors several champion trees. In 2013, Wing Haven's magnificent Tulip Poplar (Liriodendron tulipifera) at a diameter of 67 in., height of 130 ft. and a spread of 50 ft. became a Treasure Tree and Jewel of the Queen's Crown as awarded by the North Carolina Cooperative Extension Service, who started the formal Treasure Tree program in Mecklenburg County. The Elizabeth Lawrence Garden's Japanese Stewartia (Stewartia pseudocamellia) is one of the original trees of the Treasure Tree Program and is the largest recorded Japanese stewartia in Mecklenburg County. In 2000, Wing Haven Garden & Bird Sanctuary's Pin Chastetree (Vitex agnus-castus) was nominated as the nation's largest specimen of its species growing in the United States only to be surpassed in 2009 by a specimen in Texas.

Membership 
Wing Haven offers memberships which grant free access to gardens. A fee for admission is required for the public. The gardens are open Wednesday through Saturday, year-round.

References

External links 
 Wing Haven

Bird sanctuaries of the United States
Botanical gardens in North Carolina